French Korean or Korean French may refer to
 French people in Korea
 Koreans in France
 France-North Korea relations
 France-South Korea relations

See also
 Eurasian (mixed ancestry)